Min Sun-ye (born August 12, 1989), known professionally as Sunye, is a South Korean singer, actress and missionary known for her work as a former leader and main vocalist of girl group Wonder Girls. In early 2013, she stopped promotion activities with Wonder Girls ahead before of marrying her fiancé. Later in December 2014, Sunye confirmed that she officially retired from Wonder Girls and the entertainment industry.

Sunye returned to the entertainment industry in August 2018, signing with the company Polaris Entertainment. Sunye made her official solo debut with the EP Genuine on July 26, 2022, after signing with Blockberry Creative, a subsidiary of Polaris Entertainment, in February 2022.

Biography 
Sunye was born on August 12, 1989, in Seoul. She attended Korea Arts High School and Dongguk University. In 2001, Sunye was discovered by JYP Entertainment during Park Jin-young's "99% Challenge" project, where she sang and danced. She then trained at JYP Entertainment until she debuted in the Wonder Girls in 2007. Sun was one of the longest serving trainees at JYP Entertainment, along with Jo Kwon of 2AM and Min of Miss A.

Career

Wonder Girls 

In 2006, Sunye was revealed as the 1st member of Wonder Girls as the leader and main vocalist. The group, created and managed by JYP Entertainment, released their debut single, "Irony," in 2007. On January 26, 2013, JYP Entertainment confirmed that Sunye would stop her official promotions with the Wonder Girls just before marrying James Park, her Korean-Canadian fiancé. Following the news, the agency reassured fans that the group was not disbanding and that Sunye was not retiring her position as a member of the group regardless of her inactive status.

Singing career 

Sunye has contributed her vocals on the tracks of various Korean artists, including Mighty Mouth's "Energy" and Park Jin-young's "Afternoon Separation." She recorded the single "Maybe" for the soundtrack of the popular KBS Korean drama, Dream High. In November 2010, Sunye recorded "This Christmas" with her JYP labelmates as the title track for the debut of JYP Nation with a subsequent music video released on December 1, 2010.

In addition to recording collaborations, Sunye has also performed with other artists on stage, including "Stand Up for Love" with Davichi and Taeyeon on SBS Gayo Daejeon in 2008. In December 2008, she performed "Buttons" with Taeyeon, Gyuri, and Ga-in on KBS Music Bank. Sunye and her bandmate Park Ye-eun collaborated with Jo Kwon and Park Jin-young to perform "That's What Friends Are For" on the KBS program Yoon Dohyun's Love Letter. On SBS Inkigayo's 500th Episode, Sunye and Jo Kwon sang the 2AM single "This Song" as a duet.

In December 2014, Sunye stated in an interview with Joongang Ilbo's US branch at a non-profit church concert that she had officially retired from Wonder Girls and the entertainment industry. This was dismissed by JYPE as false, but less than a year later JYP released an official statement confirming Sunye's departure from the group. 

On August 8, 2018, it was announced that Sunye had signed with Polaris Entertainment and would be making her return to the entertainment industry after her long hiatus.

In 2021, the teaser for reality show Mama the Idol was released with Sunye confirmed as one of the cast members. On December 10, 2021, the first episode of the show aired on tvN. On the January 14 broadcast, members competed for the position of main vocalist which Sunye ultimately won. On January 28, Mamadol then released their debut digital single "Mama The Idol".

In February 2022, Sunye signed a contract with Blockberry Creative.

On July 12, 2022, Blockberry Creative announced her first mini album Genuine, with the lead singles "Glass Heart" and "Just A Dancer", which was released on July 26.  "Glass Heart" was pre-released on July 19.

On August 25, 2022, it was announced that Sunye will be releasing "My Regards", a remake of the Ribbon Project in collaboration with Jo Kwon, It will be released on August 28.

Philanthropy 
Along with the other Wonder Girls members, Sunye often makes charitable donations to various charities, hospitals, and orphanages around Korea. In September 2010, she made a visit to an elderly man who had secluded himself in the mountains after being a victim to many cases of fraud. According to the producer that followed her, "Sunye prepared clothes, shoes, a radio, food, and various other presents for the man. He hasn't been able to wash in a while so there was a very bad stench coming from him but Sunye paid no attention to it and held his hands tightly, asking him to live a long life. She also prayed for his good health."

In May 2011, Sunye went on a week-long volunteer mission to Haiti, where she cared for children in an orphanage and treated victims of cholera.

On October 16, 2012, Sunye was a guest speaker at George Washington University, where she presented a lecture about K-Pop, "An Idol Star's Illusions and Responsibility." The Korean Cultural Center at the South Korean embassy organized and sponsored the event.

On March 18, 2014, Sunye announced she and her husband would leave for Haiti in July, where they would live for five years to continue doing missionary work.

On January 28, 2018, it was revealed that Sunye had left Haiti after only two and a half years due to less-than-favorable conditions of raising a child, such as lack of clean water, extreme temperatures, and public safety concerns.

Personal life 
Sunye was raised by her grandparents because her mother died when Sunye was a child and her father suffered from a health condition that kept him bedridden. In the fall of 2007, prior to the Wonder Girls' promotions for their single "Tell Me," Sunye's grandfather died. In October 2009, her father was rushed to the intensive care unit after his condition turned for the worse. She took the first flight from New York, where she resided at the time, to South Korea, skipping out on numerous promotional events to be with her father. On June 23, 2010, Sunye's father died due to a chronic illness he had been suffering from for over 20 years.

In 2013, Sunye married James Park. She gave birth to her first daughter, Eun-yoo (Hailey), on October 16, 2013. On April 22, 2016, she gave birth to her second daughter, Ha-jin (Elisha). On January 30, 2019, she gave birth to her third daughter, Yoo-jin (Madison).

Sunye is a Christian.

Discography

Albums

Singles

Collaborations

Filmography

Variety show

Film

Theater

Tours

Concert participation 
 2010 Park Jin-young Bad Party – The Dancer (2010)

Awards and nominations

Notes

References

External links 

 Sunye's Official Twitter

1989 births
Living people
Wonder Girls members
Dongguk University alumni
JYP Entertainment artists
English-language singers from South Korea
Japanese-language singers of South Korea
Singers from Seoul
South Korean female idols
South Korean women pop singers
South Korean television personalities
Trot singers
Yeoheung Min clan
South Korean Christians